Herminia Bouza (born September 25, 1965) is a retired javelin thrower from Cuba. She set her personal best (64.64 metres) on July 1, 1988 in Maturín, Venezuela.

Achievements

External links 

 Profile at trackfield.brinkster.net

1965 births
Living people
Cuban female javelin throwers
Athletes (track and field) at the 1991 Pan American Games
Pan American Games medalists in athletics (track and field)
Pan American Games bronze medalists for Cuba
Central American and Caribbean Games gold medalists for Cuba
Competitors at the 1990 Central American and Caribbean Games
Central American and Caribbean Games medalists in athletics
Medalists at the 1991 Pan American Games
20th-century Cuban women
20th-century Cuban people